Zapuže pri Kostelu is a small settlement northwest of Kostel in southern Slovenia. The area is part of the traditional region of Lower Carniola and is now included in the Southeast Slovenia Statistical Region.

Name
The name of the settlement was changed from Zapuže to Zapuže pri Kostelu in 1953.

References

External links
Zapuže pri Kostelu on Geopedia

Populated places in the Municipality of Kostel